Ip Koon Hung (25 September 1919 – 2007) was a Hong Kong tennis player. He was described by the Leeds Intelligencer as a "fluent stylist" with an "inexhaustible supply of tricks".

Career
Ip, who claimed a record 53 Hong Kong major titles, became the first player from the British colony to compete at Wimbledon in 1950. He was runner-up to Nigel Cockburn for the Wimbledon Plate in 1951 and won his first round Wimbledon match in 1954, over Jean-Claude Molinari.

At the Hong Kong National Grass Court Championships, Ip won 15 singles crowns (1947, 1949–1952, 1959–1964). He also won the Hong Kong National Hardcourt Championships ten times (1949, 1952–53, 1955, 1958–60, 1962–64)

Ip won the won the Malaysian International Championships in 1949. He also had success during his tours of Great Britain (1950– 1952). In 1950 he won the Sutton Coldfield Grass Court tournament. In 1951 he won the title at Chapel Allerton Open, beating Polish veteran Ignacy Tłoczyński in the final. 

In 1952 he retained his Chapel Allerton title defeating the Australian player Don Tregonning, and also went on to win the Hoylake & West Kirby Open over Ignacy Tłoczyński. In 1954 he won the singles, men's doubles and mixed doubles titles at the Ulster Grass Court Championships.

References

External links
 

1919 births
2007 deaths
Hong Kong male tennis players